The Golden Chersonese or Golden Khersonese (Chrysḗ Chersónēsos), meaning the Golden Peninsula, was the name used for the Malay Peninsula by Greek and Roman geographers in classical antiquity, most famously in Claudius Ptolemy's 2nd-century Geography.

Name
The earliest references to a fabulous land of gold that could be interpreted as places in South East Asia may be found in Indian literature.  In Ramayana, there are mentions of Suvarnabhumi (Land of Gold) and Suvarnadvipa (the Golden Island or Peninsula, where dvipa might refer to either a peninsula or an island) Greek knowledge of lands further to their east improved after the conquests of Alexander the Great, but specific references to places in South East Asia did not appear until after the rise of the Roman Empire. Greek and Roman geographers Eratosthenes, Dionysius Periegetes, and Pomponius Mela had written about a Golden Isle (Khrysē, Chryse Insula), which some in modern times argued to mean Sumatra while excluding the Malay Peninsula. Pliny in Natural History, however, referred to Chryse as both a promontory and an island.

Ptolemy's Geography, based on the work by Marinus of Tyre, contains the best-known and perhaps the earliest reference to the Golden Chersonese. However, Geography includes information added by later geographers, and the first specific mention of the Golden Chersonese may be in the work of Marcian of Heraclea. Chersonese means peninsula in Greek, and although a few early scholars had attempted to link the Golden Chersonese with Lower Burma, the term is now generally accepted to mean the Malay Peninsula.  The Malay Peninsula is thought to have been a producer of gold in ancient times, and gold mines in Patani and Pahang were still mentioned in the 17th century by the Malay-Portuguese writer Godinho de Erédia.  Although gold is now not a major product of modern-day Malaysia, it is still being mined, for example in Raub in Pahang.

Cartographic references
 

The Golden Chersonese appears in the map of Ptolemy, which gives some geographical locations on the peninsula. The earliest surviving maps of Ptolemy, however, came from the end of the 13th century. Note that Ptolemy, like many early geographers, believed the Indian Ocean to be a closed sea, and maps based on Ptolemy's work show Golden Chersonese to be located within a closed basin. To the east of the Golden Peninsula is the Great Gulf, which is enclosed further east by the border of terra incognita (unknown lands). Arab geographers were aware that the idea of the Indian Ocean as a closed basin was mistaken by the 8th century, for example in the work of al-Khwārizmī, Book of the Description of the Earth.  They showed that the Indian Ocean might be linked to the World Oceans, with the eastern limit of the inhabited world beyond the Malay Peninsula being the Island of the Jewel in the Sea of Darkness. The Ptolemaic eastern shore became the Dragon's Tail peninsula.

The Golden Chersonese is shown on the mappa mundi of Andreas Walsperger made in Constance around 1448. It bears the inscription, hic rex caspar habitavit (here lived King Caspar). Caspar was one of the Three Magi who worshipped the newborn Christ at Bethlehem.

Martin of Bohemia, on his 1492 geographical globe, located the islands of Chryse and Argyre ("Gold" and "Silver") in the vicinity of Zipangu (Japan), which was said to be "rich in gold" by Marco Polo. An expedition was sent to find the purported islands in this location under the command of Pedro de Unamuno in 1587.

Geographical locations

The names of various geographical features and settlements of the Golden Chersonese are given in Ptolemy's Geography, including towns and rivers.  Different identities however have suggested by different scholars for these names. Although coordinates are given for many of these places, they are not considered reliable for places so far away from the Mediterranean as they may not be based on astronomical observation, and therefore cannot be reliably used for identification.  Ptolemy's work was also copied and translated over many hundreds of years, with the oldest surviving version copied over a thousand years after it was written, and errors may have been introduced.

Rivers
The Ptolemy map shows three rivers which are joined together to form as their source a single river which does not actually exist.  It has however been suggested that this might be an indication of the existence of an ancient transpeninsular route that linked Perak and Pahang, a short cut between the east and west coasts of the Malay Peninsula.
Khrysoanas river, meaning "River of Gold", proposed to be various rivers on the west coast, from the Trang River (in southern Thailand) or Lungu River, to the Perak River or the Bernam River, or further south the Muar River.
Palandas river, proposed to be Johor River by a number of scholars. 
Attabas river, which most authors agreed to be the Pahang River.

Settlements
 Takola  – a trading emporion, located at Trang in southern Thailand according to most authors. Takua Pa is another suggestion.  Takola was known to the Indians in ancient times; a place named Takkola is mentioned in the 2nd or 3rd century Indian texts Maha Niddesa and Milinda Panha, and it is also considered to be the same as the Talaittakkōlam mentioned in the 1030 Tanjore inscription as one of the places conquered by Rajendra Chola in his invasion of Srivijaya. These Indian sources indicate the existence of Takola from the 3rd to 11th century.
Konkonagara – a place near the Khrysoanas, with many scholars placing it in Perak (e.g. at Kuala Kangsar, in the Kinta District, or along the Bernam river), but some placed it further north on the Muda River in Kedah, or in Krabi opposite Phuket in Thailand. It is thought to be an Indian name, but it has also been proposed to be a hybrid of Malay and Sanskrit – kolong-kolong (or kekolong) and negara, meaning "the country of mines". Some writers have suggested link  with Gangga Negara.
Sabara or Sabana – the second emporion, variously proposed to be in Selangor or near Klang, or just south of Malacca, or south Johor, as well as Singapore.
 Tharra – at least 10 different sets of coordinates have been given in different texts for this site, it is therefore difficult to pinpoint and there is no agreement in its identification.
Palanda – suggested to be Kota Tinggi by a few authors.
Kalonka –  various sites ranging from Chumphon Province in southern Thailand to the Pahang River basin have been proposed.
 Kole polis – thought to be located on the north east coast of the Malay Peninsula, and suggested to be in Kelantan, or somewhere between Kemaman River and Kuantan.
 Perimula - placed on the north east coast of the Malay Peninsula, suggestions include Ligor, the deltas of Kelantan or Trengganu River, and Redang Island.

Other features
 Cape Maleou-kolon – the name appears to refer to a "Malay Point", perhaps the south east corner of the Malay Peninsula.  Some have identified it as Tanjung Penyabong or Tanjung Tenggaroh in Johor to Tanjung Gelang in Pahang.
 The Perimulikos gulf – possibly the Gulf of Siam, although alternative proposals ranging from the Bay of Patani to the lake of Tale Sap in Songkhla have been suggested.

See also
 Cathay
 Daqin
 Kattigara
 Suvarnabhumi
 Sino-Roman relations
 Serica
 "Great Golden Peninsula", another gold-related name used for Southeast Asia by Chinese emigrants in later times
 Greece–Indonesia relations
 Greece–Malaysia relations
 Mainland Southeast Asia
 History of Malaysia
 Malay Peninsula

References

Bibliography

Geography of Southeast Asia
Malay Peninsula
Ptolemy
Ancient Greek geography
Historical regions